Dichagyris renigera is a moth of the family Noctuidae. It is found in South- and Southeast-Europe, Armenia, Caucasus and Turkey.

Description
Warren (1914) states R. renigera Hbn. (= dumosa Donz.) (13 e). Forewing greyish ochreous, thickly dusted with fuscous or grey, especially the space between outer and submarginal lines; markings obscure; lines marked by dark spots on costa; stigmata faintly yellowish; hindwing greyish fuscous.A south European species, found in Spain, France, Italy, Switzerland, Carinthia, Bosnia, and Hungary; also in Armenia, Asia Minor, Syria,Persia, Turkestan, and Mongolia: the Asiatic forms differ in colouration from the European; they have been separated by Staudinger as ab. turana Stgr.[syn Dichagyris devota (Christoph, 1884)]], which is pale ochreous, with the grey tinge less conspicuous: ab. intermedia Stgr. [syn Dichagyris forficula (Eversmann, 1851)] (13 e), which is dark violaceous grey with markings obscure; ab. erubescens Stgr., in which the ochreous deepens into fulvous or reddish, and the markings become distinct; and ab. funebris Stgr (13 e), which is leaden grey; but erubescens [species Dichagyris erubescens (Staudinger, [1892] and intermedia [syn Dichagyris forficula (Eversmann, 1851)] may well form a species apart, as Staudinger himself suggested.

Subspecies
Dichagyris renigera renigera (Alps)
Dichagyris renigera funetissima (Bubacek, 1926) (Spain, Pyrenees)
Dichagyris renigera argentina (Caradja, 1930)

Biology
There is one generation per year. The moth occurs from early June to early August, visits sugar and comes to light.

References

Reading
 Michael Fibiger: Noctuidae Europaeae Volume 1, Entomological Press, Søro 1990, p. 121–123

External links
 Funet Distribution
Lepiforum.de

renigera
Moths described in 1808
Moths of Europe
Moths of Asia
Taxa named by Jacob Hübner